Gastón Hugo Mazzacane (born 8 May 1975) is an Argentine racing driver. He participated in 21 Formula One Grands Prix, debuting on 12 March 2000. He scored no championship points. His father, Hugo Mazzacane named him after Argentine touring car racer Gastón Perkins.

Mazzacane has also raced in Turismo Carretera and was the first TC Pick Up champion in 2018.

Racing career
Mazzacane is Argentina's most recent Formula One driver, but is often known as a "pay driver".
 He began his Formula One career in 1999 as the test driver for Minardi. In late February , it was announced that he would be the teammate of Marc Gené in the race team. "I intend to learn over the first half of the season and then I feel I will have the confidence to perform well," Mazzacane told the press at the launch of the Minardi M02. His debut year in Formula One began with a broken gearbox at his first race, the 2000 Australian Grand Prix, followed by a 10th place in Brazil. He went on to outqualify Gené at Imola, a feat he later accomplished twice more. The German Grand Prix was a relative high point for him; after outqualifying his teammate, he finished 11th. His highlight in the spotlights this season was on a damp Indianapolis track when he famously overtook Mika Häkkinen, who was struggling after an early gamble on dry tyres. After running up to third without stopping, he ran over his pitcrew and dropped out of the race later. Nevertheless, he finished 11 of the 17 races that year and ranked third among drivers with the most kilometres raced.

At the start of 2001, Mazzacane tested for Arrows, but finally settled into the Prost team, taking over the seat of the Sauber-bound Nick Heidfeld. He beat CART's Oriol Servia for the Prost spot, and was announced as the second driver in January . However, the 2001 San Marino Grand Prix was his final Formula One race. Alain Prost fired him by using a performance clause in his contract, and the vacancy was filled by Luciano Burti, who had recently been sacked from Jaguar Racing.

Mazzacane signed a contract with the reformed DART team a/k/a Phoenix, which had plans to race in the  season. However, it was not to be as the team was barred from racing.

He then went to the US and competed in the last half of the 2004 Champ Car season with the Dale Coyne Racing #19 car.

Motorsport career results

Complete International Formula 3000 results
(key) (Races in bold indicate pole position) (Races in italics indicate fastest lap)

Complete Formula One results
(key)

† Did not finish, but was classified as he had completed more than 90% of the race distance.

American Open-Wheel
(key)

Champ Car

References

External links
Gastón Mazzacane in focus 
Profile on F1 Rejects

Argentine racing drivers
Argentine Formula One drivers
Argentine people of Italian descent
Champ Car drivers
Sportspeople from La Plata
1975 births
Living people
Minardi Formula One drivers
Top Race V6 drivers
TC 2000 Championship drivers
FIA GT Championship drivers
Prost Formula One drivers
International Formula 3000 drivers
Rolex Sports Car Series drivers
Turismo Carretera drivers
BVM Racing drivers
Team Astromega drivers
Dale Coyne Racing drivers
Piquet GP drivers